Richard Beck may refer to:

Richard Beck (music manager) (born 1972), British music manager
Richard Beck (rugby union) (born 1989), English rugby union player
Richard Beck (scholar) (1897–1980), American literary historian
Rick Beck (born 1956), member of the Arkansas House of Representatives
Rich Beck (born 1940), former Major League Baseball pitcher

See also
The Rape of Richard Beck, a 1985 American television movie